The 2022–23 Melbourne Renegades Women's season was the eighth in the team's history. Coached by Simon Helmot and captained by Sophie Molineux, the Renegades finished the regular season of WBBL08 in seventh position and failed to qualify for the finals.

Squad 
Each 2022–23 squad was made up of 15 active players. Teams could sign up to five 'marquee players', with a maximum of three of those from overseas. Marquees are classed as any overseas player, or a local player who holds a Cricket Australia national contract at the start of the WBBL|08 signing period.

Personnel changes made ahead of the season included:

 Australian marquee Tayla Vlaeminck returned to the Renegades, departing the Hobart Hurricanes. Due to injury, Vlaeminck and fellow Australian marquee Georgia Wareham were unavailable for the tournament.
 Holly Ferling departed the Renegades, signing with the Perth Scorchers.
 Jess Duffin did not re-sign with the Renegades.
 Sarah Coyte signed with the Renegades, having previously played for the Adelaide Strikers and Sydney Sixers.
 Georgia Prestwidge signed with the Renegades, having previously played for the Brisbane Heat.
 Indian marquee Jemimah Rodrigues departed the Renegades, signing with the Melbourne Stars.
 Barbadian marquee Hayley Matthews signed with the Renegades, having previously played for the Hobart Hurricanes.
 South African marquee Shabnim Ismail returned to the Renegades for the first time since WBBL|01, having also previously played for the Sydney Thunder.
 English marquee Eve Jones did not initially return to the Renegades, but later signed as a replacement player.
Changes made during the season included:

 Sri Lankan marquee Chamari Athapaththu returned to the Renegades, having played for the side between WBBL|03 and WBBL|05, replacing the injured Harmanpreet Kaur.
 Paris Bowdler signed as a local replacement player, after Josie Dooley sustained a hip injury.
 Hayley Matthews stood in as acting captain for two games, after Sophie Molineux sustained a knee injury.

The table below lists the Renegades players and their key stats (including runs scored, batting strike rate, wickets taken, economy rate, catches and stumpings) for the season.

Ladder

Fixtures 

All times are AEDT.

In the 15th meeting between the two Melbourne teams—the first to take place in their home city since 30 November 2019—the Renegades lost three early wickets before Josie Dooley and Courtney Webb formed a 50-run partnership from 39 balls. Sarah Coyte hit two sixes off the bowling of Kim Garth in the 20th over, helping to set a target of 149 for victory.

The Stars began the run chase sluggishly, and failed to capitalise on several controversial umpiring decisions in their favour. Alice Capsey survived a close stumping chance but was ultimately dismissed for just eleven, while the Decision Review System overturned an LBW call for Garth who would nevertheless fall to the bowling of Coyte in the following over. Earlier in the innings, Coyte became the eighth player in WBBL history to claim 100 career wickets.

Annabel Sutherland breathed life into the contest as the Stars scored 22 runs from the 14th over against the previously economical Ella Hayward. The Renegades created several opportunities to effectively close out the match but put down key catching chances, which included an error in the field by Shabnim Ismail off her own bowling.

Needing an unlikely 23 runs from six balls to win, Sutherland promptly launched two sixes to dramatically shift the game's momentum. While delivering the third ball of the final over, Renegades captain Sophie Molineux suffered a knee injury which forced her from the field. Georgia Prestwidge was subsequently given the task of finishing the over, having not bowled throughout the innings up to that point. Sutherland proceeded to hit another six, and Stars captain Nicole Faltum then scored one run off the last delivery of the match to clinch her team's sixth win against their crosstown rivals.

Statistics and awards 

 Most runs: Hayley Matthews – 253 (24th in the league)
 Highest score in an innings: Chamari Athapaththu – 75* (59) vs Hobart Hurricanes, 3 November 2022
 Most wickets: Shabnim Ismail, Sophie Molineux – 11 each (equal 24th in the league)
 Best bowling figures in an innings: Sophie Molineux – 4/23 (4 overs) vs Adelaide Strikers, 16 October 2022
 Most catches (fielder): Sarah Coyte, Ella Hayward – 4 each (equal 31st in the league)
 Player of the Match awards:
 Sophie Molineux – 2
 Erica Kershaw, Georgia Prestwidge – 1 each
 WBBL|08 Player of the Tournament: Hayley Matthews (equal 9th)

References

Further reading

 

2022–23 Women's Big Bash League season by team
Melbourne Renegades (WBBL)